Kitty at Boarding School is a short American silent comedy film produced by the Edison Company in 1912.

Release
The film was released in the United States on October 21, 1912, and remained in circulation on US screens through at least the following January.

References

External links
 

1912 films
1912 comedy films
1912 short films
Silent American comedy films
American black-and-white films
Films set in boarding schools
American silent short films
American comedy short films
1910s American films